The Amistad Gymnasium is a historic gymnasium located in Amistad, New Mexico. The gymnasium was proposed in 1935 by the Works Progress Administration; construction was completed in 1937. The WPA built many gymnasiums in rural New Mexico during the Great Depression, as these projects provided jobs and a community meeting place to residents. The gymnasium in Amistad was no different, as it created roughly 50 construction jobs and hosted community dances, gatherings, and sporting events. The building has a Pueblo Revival style design with Art Deco influences, reflecting the WPA's tradition of incorporating local styles into modern designs. Two Zia sun symbols on the front of the building denote its year of completion.

The gymnasium was added to the National Register of Historic Places in 1996.

See also

 National Register of Historic Places listings in Union County, New Mexico

References

External links

Buildings and structures in Union County, New Mexico
Event venues on the National Register of Historic Places in New Mexico
Sports venues on the National Register of Historic Places
Pueblo Revival architecture in New Mexico
Works Progress Administration in New Mexico
National Register of Historic Places in Union County, New Mexico
1937 establishments in New Mexico
Sports venues completed in 1937